Olivia Nuzzi (born January 6, 1993) is a political reporter who serves as the Washington correspondent for New York magazine.

Early and personal life
Nuzzi was born in New York City. She is the daughter of Kelly and John Nuzzi, who was born in Brooklyn, New York, worked for the New York City Department of Sanitation for 20 years, and died in December 2015. After his death, Nuzzi wrote about him for The Daily Beast. Her mother, Kelly Nuzzi, died in February 2021.  After her death, Nuzzi wrote about her for New York Magazine.  She has a brother, Jonathan.

Nuzzi grew up in the River Plaza neighborhood of Middletown Township, New Jersey. Nuzzi attended and graduated from Middletown High School South. 

She attended Fordham University.

Career
She began her writing career as a teenager in 2011, as a monthly political columnist for the triCityNews, an alt weekly based in Asbury Park, New Jersey. She also wrote for More Monmouth Musings, a politically conservative blog and news website.

Weiner mayoral campaign
While she was a 20-year-old junior at Fordham University in 2013, Nuzzi volunteered as an intern for Anthony Weiner's New York City mayoral campaign. During her brief stint with the campaign, she was hired as a staff writer by NSFWcorp and described her experiences as an intern on the Weiner campaign in a blog post on July 28, 2013. In it, she asserted that Weiner referred to her and another female intern as "Monica," that an unnamed source told her that Weiner had lied to his campaign manager, who had quit as a result, and that the manager was one of a "series of staffers who have fled the campaign".

The New York Daily News commissioned her to write a follow-up article about the campaign that became a July 30, 2013, front-page story. According to Nuzzi, some of her fellow interns were working in the campaign because they were hoping to meet Weiner's wife Huma Abedin, and, through Abedin, her boss Hillary Clinton, to be involved in Clinton's anticipated run for the presidency.

In an interview with Talking Points Memo that was published that day, Weiner Communications Director Barbara Morgan, who later said she thought her interview was off the record, said Nuzzi "was clearly there because she wanted to be seen.... she would just not show up for work," that Nuzzi had signed and violated a non-disclosure agreement, and that Morgan had earlier "tried to fire her, but she begged to come back and I gave her a second chance." Morgan later apologized to Nuzzi, and Nuzzi accepted the apology.

Presidential campaigns and national correspondent
Nuzzi was hired by The Daily Beast in May 2014 while still attending Fordham. Nuzzi left school before graduating to take the job. At The Daily Beast, Nuzzi covered the presidential campaigns of Rand Paul and Chris Christie, as well as Donald Trump's political rise.

In November 2016, Politico named Nuzzi one of the "16 Breakout Media Stars" of the presidential election. In December 2016, Mediaite listed Nuzzi as one of 2016's 25 "most influential" people in news media. In 2018, Forbes included Nuzzi on its annual "30 Under 30" list.

In February 2017, Nuzzi was hired by New York magazine to be its Washington correspondent. She has also written for Politico Magazine, GQ, Esquire, and The Washington Post.

In early 2018, Nuzzi admitted to entering the home office of Corey Lewandowski, Trump's former campaign manager, without permission, and taking a photo, while Lewandowski accused her of also taking a photo album of his. Nuzzi said: "You know, I just walked into the house, because nobody was answering at the door." She left the home after texting her boyfriend. Nuzzi said he advised her that "it probably wasn't legal and that I should leave. I was like, 'Fuck.'"

In October 2018, Trump personally invited Nuzzi into the Oval Office for an exclusive interview.

Personal life
She resides in Washington, D.C. In September 2022, Nuzzi became engaged to chief Washington correspondent for Politico Ryan Lizza.

References

1993 births
Living people
21st-century American journalists
American columnists
American writers of Italian descent
American political journalists
Fordham University alumni
Journalists from New Jersey
Journalists from New York City
Middletown High School South alumni
New York (magazine) people
American opinion journalists
People from Middletown Township, New Jersey
People from New York City
American women columnists
21st-century American women writers